Andrew Barton "Banjo" Paterson,  (17 February 18645 February 1941) was an Australian bush poet, journalist and author. He wrote many ballads and poems about Australian life, focusing particularly on the rural and outback areas, including the district around Binalong, New South Wales, where he spent much of his childhood. Paterson's more notable poems include "Clancy of the Overflow" (1889), "The Man from Snowy River" (1890) and "Waltzing Matilda" (1895), regarded widely as Australia's unofficial national anthem.

Early life
Andrew Barton Paterson was born at the property "Narrambla", near Orange, New South Wales, the eldest son of Andrew Bogle Paterson, a Scottish immigrant from Lanarkshire, and Australian-born Rose Isabella Barton, related to the future first Prime Minister of Australia Edmund Barton. Paterson's family lived on the isolated Buckinbah Station near Yeoval NSW until he was five when his father lost his wool clip in a flood and was forced to sell up. When Paterson's uncle John Paterson died, his family took over John Paterson's farm in Illalong, near Yass, close to the main route between Melbourne and Sydney.  Bullock teams, Cobb and Co coaches and drovers were familiar sights to him. He also saw horsemen from the Murrumbidgee River area and Snowy Mountains country take part in picnic races and polo matches, which led to his fondness of horses and inspired his writings.

Paterson's early education came from a governess, but when he was able to ride a pony, he was taught at the bush school at Binalong. In 1874 Paterson was sent to Sydney Grammar School, performing well both as a student and a sportsman. During this time, he lived in a cottage called Rockend, in the suburb of Gladesville. The cottage is now listed on the Register of the National Estate and New South Wales State Heritage Register. He left the prestigious school at 16 after failing an examination for a scholarship to the University of Sydney.

Career
Paterson was a law clerk with a Sydney-based firm headed by Herbert Salwey, and was admitted as a solicitor in 1886. In the years he practised as a solicitor, he also started writing. From 1885, he began submitting and having poetry published in The Bulletin, a literary journal with a nationalist focus. His earliest work was a poem criticising the British war in the Sudan, which also had Australian participation. Over the next decade, the influential journal provided an important platform for Paterson's work, which appeared under the pseudonym of "The Banjo", the name of his favourite horse. As one of its most popular writers through the 1890s, he formed friendships with other significant writers in Australian literature, such as E.J. Brady, Harry "Breaker" Morant, Will H. Ogilvie, and Henry Lawson. In particular, Paterson became engaged in a friendly rivalry of verse with Lawson about the allure of bush life.

Journalism

Paterson became a war correspondent for The Sydney Morning Herald and The Age during the Second Boer War, sailing for South Africa in October 1899. There he met fellow war correspondents Winston Churchill and Rudyard Kipling as well as British army leaders Kitchener, Roberts and Haig.

His graphic accounts of the relief of Kimberley, surrender of Bloemfontein (the first correspondent to ride in) and the capture of Pretoria attracted the attention of the press in Britain. An untouched box of chocolates, created by the British company Cadburys for Queen Victoria as a 1900 New Year's gift for troops serving in South Africa, was discovered in Paterson's papers at the National Library of Australia in 2020. He also was a correspondent during the Boxer Rebellion, where he met George "Chinese" Morrison and later wrote about his meeting. He was editor of the Sydney Evening News (1904–06) and of the Town and Country Journal (1907–08).

Hiatus and military service
In 1908 after a trip to the United Kingdom he decided to abandon journalism and writing and moved with his family to a  property near Yass.

In World War I, Paterson failed to become a correspondent covering the fighting in Flanders, but did become an ambulance driver with the Australian Voluntary Hospital, Wimereux, France. He returned to Australia early in 1915 and, as an honorary vet, travelled on three voyages with horses to Africa, China and Egypt. He was commissioned in the 2nd Remount Unit, Australian Imperial Force on 18 October 1915, serving initially in France where he was wounded and reported missing in July 1916 and latterly as commanding officer of the unit based in Cairo, Egypt. He was repatriated to Australia and discharged from the army having risen to the rank of major in April 1919. His wife had joined the Red Cross and worked in an ambulance unit near her husband.

Later life

Just as he returned to Australia, the third collection of his poetry, Saltbush Bill JP, was published and he continued to publish verse, short stories and essays while continuing to write for the weekly Truth. Paterson also wrote on rugby league football in the 1920s for the Sydney Sportsman.

Personal life

On 8 April 1903 he married Alice Emily Walker, of Tenterfield Station, in St Stephen's Presbyterian Church, in Tenterfield, New South Wales. Their first home was in Queen Street, Woollahra. The Patersons had two children, Grace (born in 1904) and Hugh (born in 1906).

Paterson had been previously engaged to Sarah Riley for eight years, but this was abruptly called off in 1895 following a visit to her at Dagworth Station in Queensland where she was visiting the Macpherson family. It was here that Paterson met his fiancée's best friend from school days, Christina Macpherson, who composed the music for which he then wrote the lyrics of the famous Waltzing Matilda. However, following this collaboration Paterson was suddenly asked to leave the property, leading historians to conclude that he was a womanizer and had engaged in a scandalous romantic liaison with Macpherson.

Paterson died of a heart attack in Sydney on 5 February 1941 aged 76. Paterson's grave, along with that of his wife, is in the Northern Suburbs Memorial Gardens and Crematorium, Sydney.

Works

The publication of The Man from Snowy River and five other ballads in The Bulletin made "The Banjo" a household name. In 1895, Angus & Robertson published these poems as a collection of Australian verse. The book sold 5000 copies in the first four months of publication.

In 1895, Paterson headed north to Dagworth station near Winton, Queensland. Travelling with fiancée, Sarah Riley, they met with her old school friend, Christina Macpherson, who had recently attended a race at Warrnambool in Victoria. She had heard a band playing a tune there, which became stuck in her head and replayed it for Paterson on the autoharp. The melody also resonated with him and propelled him to write 
"Waltzing Matilda" While there has been much debate about what inspired the words, the song became one of his most widely known and sung ballads.

In addition, he wrote the lyrics for songs with piano scores, such as "The Daylight is Dying" and Last Week. These were also published by Angus & Robertson between the years 1895 to 1899. In 1905, the same publishers released Old Bush Songs, a collection of bush ballads Paterson had been assembling since 1895.

Although for most of his adult life, Paterson lived and worked in Sydney, his poems mostly presented a highly romantic view of the bush and the iconic figure of the bushman. Influenced by the work of another Australian poet, John Farrell, his representation of the bushman as a tough, independent and heroic underdog became the ideal qualities underpinning the national character. His work is often compared to the prose of Henry Lawson, particularly the seminal work, "The Drover's Wife", which presented a considerably less romantic view of the harshness of rural existence of the late 19th century.

Paterson authored two novels; An Outback Marriage (1906) and The Shearer's Colt (1936), wrote many short stories; Three Elephant Power and Other Stories (1917), and wrote a book based on his experiences as a war reporter, Happy Dispatches (1934).  He also wrote a book for children, The Animals Noah Forgot (1933)

Contemporary recordings of many of Paterson's well known poems have been released by Jack Thompson, who played Clancy in the 1982 film adaptation of "The Man from Snowy River". While having no connection to the movie, an Australian television series of the same name was broadcast in the 1990s.

Media reports in August 2008 stated that a previously unknown poem had been found in a war diary written during the Boer War.

Legacy

Banjo Paterson's image appears on the $10 note, along with an illustration inspired by "The Man From Snowy River" and, as part of the copy-protection microprint, the text of the poem itself.

In 1981 he was honoured on a postage stamp issued by Australia Post.

A. B. Paterson College, at Arundel on the Gold Coast, Australia, is named after Paterson.

The A. B. "Banjo" Paterson Library at Sydney Grammar School was named after Paterson.

The Festival of Arts in Orange, New South Wales, presents a biennial Banjo Paterson Award for poetry and one-act plays and there is also an annual National Book Council Banjo Award. Orange also has an annual Banjo Paterson Poetry Festival.

A privately owned 47-year-old Wooden Diesel vessel from Carrum, Victoria, was christened with the name Banjo Paterson and coincidentally, runs regularly up and down the Patterson River.

In 1983, a rendition of "Waltzing Matilda" by country-and-western singer Slim Dusty was the first song broadcast by astronauts to Earth.

He topped the list of The Greatest of All - Our 50 Top Australians published in The Australian on 27 June 2013.

Bibliography

Collections
 The Man from Snowy River and Other Verses (1895)
 Rio Grande's Last Race and Other Verses (1902)
 Three Elephant Power and Other Stories (1917)
 Saltbush Bill, J.P., and Other Verses (1917)
 The Animals Noah Forgot (1933)
 Happy Dispatches (1934)
 The Man from Snowy River and Other Verses (1961)
 The World of 'Banjo' Paterson: His Stories, Travels, War Reports and Advice to Racegoers, edited by Clement Semmler (1967)
 Banjo Paterson's Horses: The Man from Snowy River, Father Riley's Horse, Story of Mongrel Grey (1970)
 Poems of Banjo Paterson (1974)
 Poems of Banjo Paterson : Volume Two (1976)
 The Best of Banjo Paterson compiled by Walter Stone (1977)
 Happy Dispatches: Journalistic Pieces from Banjo Paterson's days as a War Correspondent (1980)
 Banjo Paterson: Short Stories (1980)
 Banjo Paterson's Old Bush Songs edited by Graham Seal (1983)
 Banjo Paterson: A Children's Treasury (1984)
 The Banjo's Best-Loved Poems: Chosen by his Grand-Daughters compiled Rosamund Campbell and Philippa Harvie (1985)
 A. B. Paterson's Off Down the Track: racing and other yarns compiled Rosamund Campbell and Philippa Harvie (1986)
 Banjo Paterson's Poems of the Bush (1987)
 Banjo Paterson's People: selected poems and prose (1987)
 A Literary Heritage: 'Banjo' Paterson (1988)
 Banjo Paterson's Australians : Selected Poems and Prose (1989)
 A Vision Splendid: The Complete Poetry of A. B. 'Banjo' Paterson (1990)
 A. B. 'Banjo' Paterson: A Book of Verse (1990)
 Snowy River Riders: selected poems (1991)
 Selected Poems: A. B. Paterson compiled by Les Murray (1992)
 A. B. 'Banjo' Paterson: Bush Ballads, Poems, Stories and Journalism edited by Clement Semmler (1992)
 Banjo Paterson Favourites (1992)
 Singer of the Bush: The Poems of A. B. Paterson (1992)
 Selected Verse of 'Banjo' Paterson (1992)
 Banjo Paterson: His Poetry and Prose compiled by Richard Hall (1993)
 Favourite Poems of Banjo Paterson (1994)
 In the Droving Days compiled by Margaret Olds (1994)
 Under Sunny Skies (1994)
 Banjo's Animal Tales (1994)
 The Works of 'Banjo' Paterson (1996)
 The Best of Banjo Paterson compiled by Bruce Elder (1996)
 Banjo's Tall Tales (1998)
 From the Front : Being the Observations of Mr. A.B. (Banjo) Paterson: Special War Correspondent in South Africa: November 1899 to July 1900, for the Argus, the Sydney Mail, the Sydney Morning Herald edited by R. W. F. Droogleever (2000)
 Mulga Bill's Bicycle and Other Classics (2005)
 The Bush Poems of A. B. (Banjo) Paterson compiled by Jack Thompson (2008)
 The Battlefield Poems of A.B. (Banjo) Paterson compiled by Jack Thompson (2010)
 Banjo Paterson Treasury illustrated by Olso Davis (2013)
 Looking for Clancy: Ballads by A. B. 'Banjo' Paterson illustrated by Robert Ingpen (2013)
 Banjo Paterson Treasury (2013)

Selected individual works
 "Clancy of the Overflow" (1889)
 "The Man from Snowy River" (1890)
 "In Defence of the Bush" (1892)
 "The Man from Ironbark" (1892)
 "Saltbush Bill" (1894)
 "Waltzing Matilda" (1895)
 "Hay and Hell and Booligal" (1896)
 "Mulga Bill's Bicycle" (1896)
 "T.Y.S.O.N." (1898)
 "We're All Australians Now" (1915)
 "A Bush Lawyer" (1933)

References

Sources
Notes on Author: Andrew Barton Paterson
Australian Authors – A. B. ("Banjo") Paterson (1864–1941)
"Banjo" Paterson

External links

Digital collections
 
 
 
 
 
 Works by A B Paterson at Project Gutenberg Australia

Other links
 AB 'Banjo' Paterson Biographical Summary – Reserve Bank of Australia website
 *Photos of Banjo Paterson memorial outside Orange NSW
 National Geographic Society magazine August 2004 article on "Banjo" Paterson
 Banjo Paterson Biography at www.wallisandmatilda.com.au
 Paterson, Andrew Barton (Banjo) (1864–1941) The National Library of Australia's Federation Gateway (Retrieved 5 August 2007)
 Listen to the first recording of the song Waltzing Matilda on australianscreen online
 'Waltzing Matilda' was added to the National Film and Sound Archive's Sounds of Australia registry in 2008.

1864 births
1941 deaths
Australian rugby league journalists
Writers from Sydney
Australian people of Scottish descent
People of the Second Boer War
Australian war correspondents
Australian Thoroughbred Racing Hall of Fame inductees
Australian Commanders of the Order of the British Empire
People educated at Sydney Grammar School
19th-century poets
20th-century Australian poets
Australian male poets
The Man from Snowy River
19th-century Australian short story writers
19th-century Australian poets
Australian military personnel of World War I
The Sydney Morning Herald people